Jackson Township is one of twelve townships in Porter County, Indiana. As of the 2010 census, its population was 5,328.

History
Jackson Township was organized in 1836, and most likely named after President Andrew Jackson, although, after that name became controversial in the 1840s, a latter (1883) account says it was named for Lemuel Jackson, a pioneer settler.

Cities and towns
There are no incorporated communities in the township.

Education
Jackson Township is served by the Duneland School Corporation.  Their high school is Chesterton High School, located in Chesterton (Westchester Township) to the northwest.

References

External links
 Indiana Township Association
 United Township Association of Indiana

Townships in Porter County, Indiana
Townships in Indiana